Little Orpheus is a 2020 adventure platform video game developed by The Chinese Room and published by Sumo Digital's Secret Mode. The game was released on Apple Arcade on 12 June 2020 for iOS, macOS, and tvOS. It was ported to Microsoft Windows, Nintendo Switch, PlayStation 4, PlayStation 5, Xbox One and Xbox Series X/S on 13 September 2022.

Gameplay 

The game is a 2.5D action-adventure platformer.

Development and release 
The game was first shown in an Apple Arcade showcase at the Apple Event on 25 March 2019. The company's Twitter account posted a teaser with a cryptic message in the form of a telegram. Creative Europe had published the application of successful grants in August 2017, with a project "Little Orpheus" being awarded a maximum of grant €72 339 with 50% co-funding.

In a December 2019 interview with Creative Director Dan Pinchbeck, the game's intent was described as applying the studios "arthouse background to traditional genres moving forward" and with a world filled with ridiculous "Soviet space technology, Russian mythology, and ancient creatures", like a homage to Ray Harryhausen movies.

The game was released on Apple Arcade on 12 June 2020. A new game plus mode was released on 9 October 2020. An update added episode 9 on 15 January 2021. The title was set to release on Microsoft Windows, Nintendo Switch, PlayStation 4, PlayStation 5, Xbox One, and Xbox Series X/S on 1 March 2022 but was delayed due to its Soviet themes in light of the Russo-Ukrainian War. The game launched on 13 September 2022.

Reception

Critical reception 

Little Orpheus received "mixed or average" reviews according to review aggregator Metacritic.

Matt Gardner of Forbes gave the game a mixed review, praising its story but criticizing its gameplay: "Little Orpheus over-relies its strongest assets–great voice acting, an intriguing script, beautiful art, and engaging gameplay–and doesn’t hit these highs with its core gameplay." Nintendo Lifes Lowell Bell criticized the narration of the game: "there’s no narrative payoff here, no greater meaning or memorable conclusion that sticks with you".

Accolades

References

External links 

 Official Website

2020 video games
Action-adventure games
Apple Arcade games
IOS games
MacOS games
Platform games
Sumo Digital games
Video games developed in the United Kingdom
Video games scored by Jessica Curry
Video games set in outer space